Africa/Brass is the eighth studio album by jazz musician John Coltrane, released on September 1, 1961 on Impulse! Records. The sixth release for the fledgling label and Coltrane's first for Impulse!, it features Coltrane's working quartet augmented by a larger ensemble to bring the total number of participating musicians to 21. Its big band sound, with the unusual instrumentation of French horns and euphonium, presented music very different from anything that had been associated with Coltrane to date. While critics originally gave it poor ratings, more recent jazz commentators have described it as "amazing" and as a "key work in understanding the path that John Coltrane's music took in its final phases."

Background
In 1961, Coltrane came into his own as a front-rank force in jazz, his influence growing from years of live performances with Thelonious Monk, Miles Davis and leading his own groups, and from the impact of the albums Giant Steps and My Favorite Things.  
Impulse Records executive Creed Taylor bought out Coltrane's contract with Atlantic Records, making Coltrane the first artist to be signed to the new company's roster. It was the best contract a jazz musician had ever received after Davis with Columbia, one year followed by two-year options for two albums per year with a $10,000 advance against royalties the first year rising to a $20,000 advance for the second and third years. Backed by the resources of ABC Records and set up to be an instant major player in the jazz market, Impulse! offered him greater scope. Coltrane would remain with Impulse! the rest of his life, and to inaugurate his move to the new label he planned a large-group recording.

Coltrane had not been in a recording studio as a leader since the October 1960 sessions for My Favorite Things, although on March 20 and 21, 1961, he had made a last recorded contribution for Davis, guesting on two tracks for Someday My Prince Will Come. Earlier in 1961, Coltrane had invited multi-instrumentalist Eric Dolphy to join his band, making it a quintet. Around the same time, bassist Steve Davis departed, replaced by Reggie Workman, at times Coltrane pairing him with a second bassist, Art Davis. With this group in tow, on May 23 Coltrane entered the new Van Gelder Studio in Englewood Cliffs, New Jersey, for the first time; Rudy Van Gelder had been the sound engineer for most of his earlier sessions with Prestige Records. Coltrane would make the bulk of his recordings at the Van Gelder studio for the remainder of his career.

Content
Apparently, Coltrane had initially contacted Gil Evans to assist with the arrangements; however nothing came of this and Coltrane called on Dolphy and Tyner to orchestrate. Originally credited to Dolphy alone on the initial release, that has been corrected with the appearance of the 1995 reissue. Coltrane chose the traditional English folk ballad "Greensleeves," arranged in a similar major/minor contrast as his popular "My Favorite Things." For the two original pieces, "Africa" and "Blues Minor," Dolphy and Coltrane adapted Tyner's piano voicings for the orchestra. A second set of recording sessions for the album took place on June 7.

In 1974, Impulse released a second album culled from the same sessions, The Africa/Brass Sessions, Volume 2. Two additional outtakes appeared on another posthumous Coltrane compilation, Trane's Modes. On October 10, 1995, Impulse released the complete sessions on a two-disc set entitled The Complete Africa/Brass Sessions. Rather than placing the original album on one disc and the outtakes on the other, it divides the disc content by session, with the May 23 results on the first disc and those from June 7 on the second disc.

Reception and influence
In a contemporaneous review that appeared in the January 18, 1962, issue of DownBeat magazine critic Martin Williams had this to say: "In these pieces, Coltrane has done on record what he has done so often in person lately, make everything into a handful of chords, frequently only two or three, turning them in every conceivable way..."

The album impressed minimal music composer Steve Reich, who called it "basically a half-an-hour in E. Jazz musicians say, 'Hey man', what's the changes?' 'E.' 'No! E for half-an-hour!' ".

Track listing

1995 reissue disc one
All tracks recorded May 23, 1961.

1995 reissue disc two
All tracks recorded June 7, 1961.

Personnel
 John Coltrane – soprano and tenor saxophone
 Booker Little – trumpet
 Julius Watkins, Bob Northern, Donald Corrado, Robert Swisshelm  – french horn
 Bill Barber – tuba
 Pat Patrick – baritone saxophone
 McCoy Tyner – piano
 Reggie Workman – bass
 Elvin Jones – drums

May 23 session only ("Greensleeves")
 Freddie Hubbard – trumpet
 Julian Priester, Charles Greenlee – euphonium
 Jim Buffington – french horn
 Garvin Bushell – piccolo, woodwinds
 Paul Chambers – bass

June 7 session only ("Africa" and "Blues Minor")
 Britt Woodman – trombone
 Carl Bowman – euphonium
 Eric Dolphy – alto saxophone, bass clarinet, flute
 Art Davis – bass

Production
 Creed Taylor – production
 Rudy Van Gelder – audio engineering
 Eric Dolphy, McCoy Tyner – orchestration
 Romulus Franceschini – orchestration 
 Dom Cerulli – liner notes
Pete Turner – photography
 Michael Cuscuna – reissue production
 David A. Wild – reissue liner notes
 Hollis King – reissue art direction
 Jackie Thaw – reissue graphic design

References

1961 albums
John Coltrane albums
Impulse! Records albums
Albums produced by Bob Thiele
Free jazz albums
Albums produced by Creed Taylor
Albums arranged by Eric Dolphy
Albums arranged by McCoy Tyner
Albums conducted by Eric Dolphy
Albums conducted by McCoy Tyner
Albums recorded at Van Gelder Studio